The 1982 Alabama Crimson Tide football team (variously "Alabama", "UA" or "Bama") represented the University of Alabama in the 1982 NCAA Division I-A football season. It was the Crimson Tide's 88th overall and 49th season as a member of the Southeastern Conference (SEC). The team was led by head coach Bear Bryant, in his 25th and final year, and played their home games at Bryant–Denny Stadium in Tuscaloosa and Legion Field in Birmingham, Alabama. They finished season with eight wins and four losses (8–4 overall, 3–3 in the SEC) and with a victory over Illinois in the Liberty Bowl.

Alabama was 5–0 after they defeated Penn State 42–21, with the decisive play coming when a Penn State player blocked his own team's punt. But after that it was all downhill. Paul Bryant's last season as Alabama football coach saw a nine-game winning streak against Auburn and eleven-game winning streaks against Tennessee and LSU all come to an end.  The loss to Southern Miss was Alabama's first loss in Tuscaloosa since 1963, breaking a 57-game win streak in Bryant–Denny Stadium. Coach Bryant retired after Alabama's bowl victory against Illinois and died less than one month later, on January 26, 1983.

Schedule

References
General

 
 

Specific

Alabama
Alabama Crimson Tide football seasons
Liberty Bowl champion seasons
Alabama Crimson Tide football